Romano-Germanic may refer to:
Romano-Germanic culture of ancient Germanic peoples subject to the Roman Empire
Romano-Germanic law, a family of legal systems
Romano-Germanic Empire, more commonly called the Holy Roman Empire
Romano-Germanic Museum, Cologne, Germany
Romano-Germanic Central Museum (Mainz), Germany
Pontificale Romano-Germanicum ("Romano-Germanic pontifical"), a set of Latin documents of Roman Catholic liturgical practice
Romano-Germanic languages, a language group of the Indo-European language family that consists of two subgroups: the Romance languages and the Germanic languages.

Romano-German may refer to:
Romano-German emperor, a term used by some historians for any emperor of the Holy Roman Empire
"Romano-German", N.Y. Danilevsky's term for the opposite counterpart of Slavic culture in Europe

See also
Germanic Wars